Kaito Fukuda also known under the name Kaito Wor.Wanchai (ไคโตะ ว.วันชัย) in Thailand is a Japanese Muay Thai fighter.

Championships and accomplishments

Amateur
2010 Muay Thai WINDY Super Fight −40kg Champion
2011 Muay Yoko −42kg Tournament Champion
2011 Muay Thai WINDY Super Fight −45kg Champion
2012 Muay Thai WINDY Super Fight −50kg Champion
2012 TRIBELATE Flyweight Champion

Professional
World Professional Muaythai Federation 
2015 WPMF World Flyweight Champion

Professional Boxing Association of Thailand (PAT) 
2015 Thailand 112 lbs Champion (defended once)

Muay Siam
 2017 Muay Siam 115 lbs Champion

True4U Muaymanwansuk 
2018 True4u 115 lbs Champion
2019 True4u 118 lbs Champion

International MuayThai Sport Association
 2022 IMSA World Super Bantamweight Champion

Fight record

|-  style="text-align:center; background:#;"
| 2023-04-23|| ||align=left| Gaipar Por.Wisetgym || Suk Wanchai MuayThai Super Fight || Nagoya, Japan ||  || || 
|-  style="text-align:center; background:#cfc;"
| 2023-03-07||Win  ||align=left| Chiebkat Por.Phongsawang  || Muaymansananmuang, Rangsit Stadium || Bangkok, Thailand || Decision || 5 ||3:00
|-  style="background:#fbb;"
| 2022-12-09 || Loss ||align=left| Mikel Fernández || Rajadamnern World Series || Bangkok, Thailand || Decision (Unanimous) || 3 || 3:00
|-  style="text-align:center; background:#fbb;"
| 2022-10-30 || Loss ||align=left| Saenson Erawan || Suk Wanchai＋Muayded 789 MuayThai Super Fight  || Tokyo, Japan || Decision (Split) || 5 ||3:00
|-  style="text-align:center; background:#fbb;"
| 2022-10-06 || Loss ||align=left| Kongchai Chanaidonmuang || Petchyindee, Rajadamnern Stadium || Bangkok, Thailand || Decision || 5 ||3:00

|-  style="text-align:center; background:#cfc;"
| 2022-08-19 || Win ||align=left| Petchto FighterMuayThai || Rajadamnern World Series || Bangkok, Thailand || KO (Elbow)|| 2 ||

|-  style="text-align:center; background:#c5d2ea;"
| 2022-07-07 || Draw||align=left| Petchto FighterMuayThai || Petchyindee, Rajadamnern Stadium || Bangkok, Thailand || Decision || 5 ||3:00

|-  style="text-align:center; background:#cfc;"
| 2022-06-09 || Win ||align=left| Chatchai Dabransarakarm || Petchyindee, Rajadamnern Stadium  || Bangkok, Thailand || Decision || 5 || 3:00
|-

|-  style="text-align:center; background:#cfc;"
| 2022-04-24|| Win ||align=left| Kumandoi PetchyindeeAcademy|| Suk Wanchai MuayThai Super Fight  || Nagoya, Japan || Decision (Unanimous) || 5||3:00 
|-
! style=background:white colspan=9 |

|-  style="background:#fbb;"
| 2022-03-10|| Loss ||align=left| Fahpratan Dabransarakarm ||Petchyindee, Rajadamnern Stadium || Bangkok, Thailand || Decision || 5 ||3:00

|-  style="text-align:center; background:#cfc;"
| 2021-12-12|| Win||align=left| Hikaru Furumura|| HOOST CUP KINGS NAGOYA 10  || Nagoya, Japan || Decision (Unanimous)|| 5|| 3:00

|-  style="text-align:center; background:#cfc;"
| 2021-11-14|| Win ||align=left| Takanobu Sano || Suk Wan Kingthong  || Tokyo, Japan || KO (Elbow) || 5 || 0:34
|-
! style=background:white colspan=9 |

|-  style="text-align:center; background:#cfc;"
| 2021-10-10|| Win ||align=left| Khun Namisan Shobukai  || Suk Wan Kingthong "step by step" || Tokyo, Japan || Decision (Unanimous) || 3 || 3:00

|-  style="text-align:center; background:#cfc;"
| 2021-07-29|| Win||align=left| Ponchan SirilakMuayThaiGym || Suk Wan Kingthong  || Tokyo, Japan || TKO (Doctor Stoppage) || 2 ||2:14
|-
|-  style="text-align:center; background:#cfc;"
| 2021-06-13|| Win ||align=left| Satoshi Katashima || Suk Wan Kingthong "Let’s do our best!" || Tokyo, Japan ||Decision (Unanimous) ||3  ||3:00 
|-
|-  style="text-align:center; background:#fbb;"
| 2021-04-11|| Loss ||align=left| Koki Osaki || BOM WAVE 04 – Get Over The COVID-19, Bantamweight Championship Final  || Yokohama, Japan || Decision (Unanimous)  || 5 || 3:00 
|-
! style=background:white colspan=9 |
|-  style="text-align:center; background:#cfc;"
| 2021-03-07|| Win ||align=left| King Takeshi|| HOOST CUP KINGS KYOTO 7  || Kyoto, Japan ||  Decision (Unanimous) || 3 || 3:00
|-  style="text-align:center; background:#cfc;"
| 2020-10-29 || Win ||align=left| Ryota Mawatari || NO KICK NO LIFE ~Shin Shou~ || Tokyo, Japan || Decision (Unanimous)  || 5|| 3:00
|-  style="text-align:center; background:#cfc;"
| 2020-10-04||Win ||align=left| Yutto ZERO || BOM WAVE 02 Get Over The COVID-19, Bantamweight Championship Semi Final || Yokohama, Japan || TKO (Referee Stoppage) || 3 || 1:16
|-  style="text-align:center; background:#CCFFCC;"
| 2020-02-28|| Win ||align=left| Wattana MTMacademy || Rajadamnern Stadium ||Bangkok, Thailand || TKO (Punches)  || 4 ||
|-  style="text-align:center; background:#fbb;"
| 2020-01-15||Loss ||align=left| Nongyot Sitjaekan || Rajadamnern Stadium ||Bangkok, Thailand || Decision|| 5 ||3:00
|-  style="text-align:center; background:#FFBBBB;"
| 2019-12-25|| Loss||align=left| Chanyut Sakrungrung || Rajadamnern Stadium ||Bangkok, Thailand || Decision|| 5 ||3:00
|-  style="text-align:center; background:#FFBBBB;"
| 2019-12-02|| Loss||align=left| Nongyot Sitjaekan || Rajadamnern Stadium ||Bangkok, Thailand || Decision|| 5 ||3:00
|-  style="text-align:center; background:#CCFFCC;"
| 2019-10-06|| Win ||align=left| Rungnarai Kiatmuu9 || Suk Wanchai MuayThai Super Fight vol.6 ||Nagoya, Japan || KO (Body Punches)  || 3 || 
|-
! style=background:white colspan=9 |
|-  style="text-align:center; background:#FFBBBB;"
| 2019-09-11|| Loss||align=left| Charoenrit RawaiMuayThai || Rajadamnern Stadium ||Bangkok, Thailand || Decision|| 5 || 3:00
|-  style="text-align:center; background:#CCFFCC;"
| 2019-07-31|| Win||align=left| Charoenrit RawaiMuayThai || Rajadamnern Stadium ||Bangkok, Thailand || Decision|| 5 || 3:00
|-  style="text-align:center; background:#FFBBBB;"
| 2019-07-05|| Loss||align=left| Charoenrit RawaiMuayThai || Lumpinee Stadium ||Bangkok, Thailand || Decision|| 5 || 3:00
|-  style="text-align:center; background:#FFBBBB;"
| 2019-06-05|| Loss||align=left| Kaomongkol Petchyindee Academy || Rajadamnern Stadium ||Bangkok, Thailand || Decision|| 5 || 3:00
|-  style="text-align:center; background:#CCFFCC;"
| 2019-04-24|| Win||align=left| Ngatao Po.Waralak || Rajadamnern Stadium ||Bangkok, Thailand || TKO (Knees to the Body) || 4 ||
|-  style="text-align:center; background:#CCFFCC;"
| 2019-03-29|| Win||align=left| Silapathai Priwwayo || Lumpinee Stadium ||Bangkok, Thailand || KO (Left Hook to the Body) || 4 ||
|-  style="text-align:center; background:#FFBBBB;"
| 2019-02-22|| Loss||align=left| Saksit Kiatmoo9 || Lumpinee Stadium ||Bangkok, Thailand || Decision|| 5 || 3:00
|-  style="text-align:center; background:#CCFFCC;"
| 2019-01-18|| Win||align=left| Silapathai Priwwayo || Lumpinee Stadium ||Bangkok, Thailand || Decision|| 5 || 3:00
|-  style="text-align:center; background:#FFBBBB;"
| 2018-11-02|| Loss||align=left| Pamphet Wor.Sangprapai ||  ||Pathum Thani ||  Decision|| 5 || 3:00
|-  style="text-align:center; background:#CCFFCC;"
| 2018-09-24|| Win||align=left| Thanadet Thor.Pran 49 || Suk Wanchai Muay Thai Super Fight Vol.5 ||Nagoya, Japan || Decision|| 5 || 3:00 
|-
! style=background:white colspan=9 |
|-  style="text-align:center; background:#CCFFCC;"
| 2018-07-18|| Win||align=left| Jomthong Sakwichian || Rajadamnern Stadium ||Bangkok, Thailand || KO (Right Elbow)|| 3 ||
|-  style="text-align:center; background:#CCFFCC;"
| 2018-06-18|| Win||align=left| Nongbee Phriwwayo || Rajadamnern Stadium ||Bangkok, Thailand || KO (Knees to the Body)|| 4 ||
|-  style="text-align:center; background:#FFBBBB;"
| 2018-04-18|| Loss||align=left| Buakawlek Sit-Or.Boonchop || Rajadamnern Stadium ||Bangkok, Thailand || Decision || 5 || 3:00
|-  style="text-align:center; background:#CCFFCC;"
| 2018-03-19|| Win||align=left| Esankiew Numpontep || Rajadamnern Stadium ||Bangkok, Thailand || Decision || 5 || 3:00
|-  style="text-align:center; background:#FFBBBB;"
| 2017-12-21|| Loss||align=left| Kanongsuk Kor.Kampanath || Rajadamnern Stadium ||Bangkok, Thailand || Decision || 5 || 3:00
|-  style="text-align:center; background:#CCFFCC;"
| 2017-11-12|| Win||align=left| Ratanapon Nor.Anuwatgym || Rajadamnern Stadium ||Bangkok, Thailand || Decision || 5 || 3:00
|-  style="text-align:center; background:#FFBBBB;"
| 2017-08-07|| Loss||align=left| Chatphet Sor.Poonsawat || Rajadamnern Stadium ||Bangkok, Thailand || Decision || 5 || 3:00
|-  style="text-align:center; background:#CCFFCC;"
| 2017-07-05|| Win||align=left| Phetanan Bor.Jarinsak || Rajadamnern Stadium ||Bangkok, Thailand || KO||  ||
|-  style="text-align:center; background:#CCFFCC;"
| 2017-06-16|| Win||align=left| Chasar Or.Bor.Tor Rambontamai|| Ban Mo Stadium ||Thailand || KO|| 3 ||  
|-
! style=background:white colspan=9 |
|-  style="text-align:center; background:#FFBBBB;"
| 2017-05-22|| Loss||align=left| Kemphet Wor.Praianunt || Rajadamnern Stadium ||Bangkok, Thailand || Decision || 5 || 3:00
|-  style="text-align:center; background:#FFBBBB;"
| 2017-03-13|| Loss ||align=left| Dodo Lukkohkrak || Rajadamnern Stadium ||Bangkok, Thailand || TKO (Left Elbow)|| 3 ||
|-  style="text-align:center; background:#FFBBBB;"
| 2016-11-14|| Loss ||align=left| Flukenoi Moosaphanmai || Rajadamnern Stadium ||Bangkok, Thailand || Decision || 5 || 3:00
|-  style="text-align:center; background:#FFBBBB;"
| 2016-10-06|| Loss ||align=left| Ruandet Sakvichan || Rajadamnern Stadium ||Bangkok, Thailand || Decision || 5 || 3:00
|-  style="text-align:center; background:#CCFFCC;"
| 2016-09-19|| Win ||align=left| Phetchainath Sitkumnanniang || Lumpinee Stadium ||Bangkok, Thailand || KO (Knees to the Body)|| 3 ||
|-  style="text-align:center; background:#CCFFCC;"
| 2016-07-29|| Win ||align=left| Tukkatapeth Sor Kiatniwat || TOYOTA Hilux Revo Super Champ in Japan ||Tokyo, Japan || Decision (Unanimous) || 5 || 3:00 
|-
! style=background:white colspan=9 |
|-  style="text-align:center; background:#FFBBBB;"
| 2016-06-19|| Loss ||align=left| Phetmuangchon Por.Suantong || Wanchai+Kingthong MuayThai Super Fight ||Nagoya, Japan || Decision (Unanimous) || 5 || 3:00
|-  style="text-align:center; background:#FFBBBB;"
| 2016-05-03|| Loss||align=left| Phetsuphan Por.Daorungruang || Suk Daurung Yutahatti ||Suphan Buri Province, Thailand || Decision || 5 || 3:00
|-  style="text-align:center; background:#FFBBBB;"
| 2016|| Loss||align=left| Panpon Sor Waritar ||  ||Saraburi, Thailand || Decision || 5 || 3:00
|-  style="text-align:center; background:#FFBBBB;"
| 2016-03-07|| Loss||align=left|  Ruangdet Sakvichian  || Rajadamnern Stadium ||Bangkok, Thailand || Decision || 5 || 3:00
|-  style="text-align:center; background:#FFBBBB;"
| 2016-01-13|| Loss||align=left| Thanadet Thor.Pran 49 || Rajadamnern Stadium ||Bangkok, Thailand || Decision || 5 || 3:00
|-  style="text-align:center; background:#CCFFCC;"
| 2015-12-08|| Win ||align=left| Thanadet Thor.Pran 49 || Lumpinee Stadium ||Bangkok, Thailand || Decision || 5 || 3:00 
|-
! style=background:white colspan=9 |
|-  style="text-align:center; background:#CCFFCC;"
| 2015-11-06|| Win ||align=left| Kwandom Tor.Minburi || Lumpinee Stadium ||Bangkok, Thailand || Decision || 5 || 3:00 
|-
! style=background:white colspan=9 |
|-  style="text-align:center; background:#CCFFCC;"
| 2015-09-20|| Win ||align=left| Petyasor Dabrunsakarm|| Lat Phrao Boxing Stadium ||Thailand || Decision || 5 || 3:00
|-  style="text-align:center; background:#CCFFCC;"
| 2015-08-20|| Win ||align=left| Saenchainoi Rayornetnakorn|| Rajadamnern Stadium ||Bangkok, Thailand || Decision || 5 || 3:00
|-  style="text-align:center; background:#FFBBBB;"
| 2015-07-20|| Loss ||align=left| Theptaksin Sor.Sonsing|| Rajadamnern Stadium ||Bangkok, Thailand || Decision || 5 || 3:00
|-  style="text-align:center; background:#FFBBBB;"
| 2015-05-25|| Loss ||align=left| Kankaoden Farongnamkan|| Rajadamnern Stadium ||Bangkok, Thailand || Decision || 5 || 3:00
|-  style="text-align:center; background:#CCFFCC;"
| 2015-04-08|| Win ||align=left| Sanchanchai Raioinetnakhorn || Rajadamnern Stadium ||Bangkok, Thailand || Decision || 5 || 3:00
|-  style="text-align:center; background:#CCFFCC;"
| 2015-03-17|| Win ||align=left| Noppadon Petputong || Miracle Muaythai ||Ayutthaya, Thailand || Decision (Unanimous) || 5 || 3:00 
|-
! style=background:white colspan=9 |
|-  style="text-align:center; background:#CCFFCC;"
| 2015-02-05|| Win ||align=left| Petdam Sitkaensak|| Rajadamnern Stadium ||Bangkok, Thailand || Decision || 5 || 3:00
|-  style="text-align:center; background:#FFBBBB;"
| 2014-12-20|| Loss ||align=left| Ho Kwok Ken|| TOPKING WORLD SERIES HONG KONG ||Hong Kong || Decision || 5 || 3:00
|-  style="text-align:center; background:#FFBBBB;"
| 2014-11-01|| Loss ||align=left| Noppadon Petputon || Svay Rieng Stadium || Cambodia || Decision || 5 || 3:00
|-  style="text-align:center; background:#CCFFCC;"
| 2014-09-28|| Win ||align=left| Ryuji Wakayama||  ||Sendai Japan || Decision (Split) || 5 || 3:00
|-  style="text-align:center; background:#CCFFCC;"
| 2014-08-28|| Win ||align=left| Pradudam Por.Ruangrun|| Rajadamnern Stadium ||Bangkok, Thailand || KO || 3 ||
|-  style="text-align:center; background:#FFBBBB;"
| 2014-08-04|| Loss ||align=left| Pradudam Por.Ruangrun|| Rajadamnern Stadium ||Bangkok, Thailand || Decision || 5 || 3:00
|-  style="text-align:center; background:#CCFFCC;"
| 2014-07-09|| Win||align=left| Fahsun Sor.Sopit|| Rajadamnern Stadium ||Bangkok, Thailand || Decision || 5 || 3:00
|-  style="text-align:center; background:#CCFFCC;"
| 2014-05-05|| Win||align=left| Pamphet Sitkrupak|| Rajadamnern Stadium ||Bangkok, Thailand || KO|| 4 ||
|-  style="text-align:center; background:#FFBBBB;"
| 2013-11-07|| Loss||align=left| Sanchanchai Raioinetnakhorn|| Lat Phrao Boxing Stadium ||Thailand || Decision || 5 || 3:00
|-  style="text-align:center; background:#FFBBBB;"
| 2013-08-15|| Loss||align=left| Sanchanchai Raioinetnakhorn|| Rajadamnern Stadium ||Bangkok, Thailand || Decision || 5 || 3:00
|-  style="text-align:center; background:#CCFFCC;"
| 2013-07-07|| Win||align=left| Shoya Saito|| Senjou 10 League 22 Dragonboxing ||Japan || Decision|| 3 || 3:00
|-  style="text-align:center; background:#CCFFCC;"
| 2013-04-10|| Win||align=left| Densin Sor Sorpit|| Rajadamnern Stadium ||Bangkok, Thailand || KO || 4 ||
|-  style="text-align:center; background:#CCFFCC;"
| 2013-03-30|| Win||align=left| Hantalay Rungportong|| ||Thailand || Decision || 5 || 2:00
|-  style="text-align:center; background:#CCFFCC;"
| 2013-02-24|| Win||align=left| Ryosuke Kumai|| HOOST CUP Spirits 2||Nagoya, Japan || TKO (Doctor Stoppage)|| 3 ||
|-  style="text-align:center; background:#CCFFCC;"
| 2012-08-12|| Win||align=left| Petek Lukforungket|| ||Thailand ||Decision|| 5 || 2:00
|-  style="text-align:center; background:#FFBBBB;"
| 2012-04-07|| Loss||align=left| Singnon Sitjapun|| ||Thailand ||KO|| 4 ||
|-  style="text-align:center; background:#FFBBBB;"
| 2012-02-18|| Loss||align=left| Narongrit Wor.Sentep||Lumpinee Stadium ||Bangkok, Thailand ||Decision||  ||
|-  style="text-align:center; background:#CCFFCC;"
| 2011-11-09|| Win||align=left| Petek Porngket||Rajadamnern Stadium ||Bangkok, Thailand || Decision || 5 || 2:00
|-  style="text-align:center; background:#FFBBBB;"
| 2011-08-19|| Loss||align=left| Narongrit Wor.Sentep||Lumpinee Stadium ||Bangkok, Thailand || Decision || 5 || 3:00
|-
| colspan=9 | Legend:    

|-  style="background:#CCFFCC;"
| 2012-11-10|| Win||align=left| Kaito Gibu|| TRIBELATE Shinjuku Face||Japan || Decision || 3 || 3:00 
|-
! style=background:white colspan=9 |
|-  style="background:#CCFFCC;"
| 2012-09-22|| Win||align=left| Hamachi|| Muay Thai Windy Super Fight 14||Tokyo, Japan || Decision || 3 || 3:00
|-  style="background:#CCFFCC;"
| 2012-07-01|| Win||align=left| Yuzuki Sakai|| Muay Thai Windy Super Fight – NAGOYA – Muaythaiphoon 2||Nagoya, Japan || Decision || 5 || 2:00
|-  style="background:#FFBBBB;"
| 2012-06-10|| Loss||align=left| Yugo Flyskygym|| Muay Thai Windy Super Fight 12||Japan || Decision || 5 || 2:00 
|-
! style=background:white colspan=9 |
|-  style="background:#CCFFCC;"
| 2012-04-29|| Win||align=left| Yuki Egawa|| 8th Kaikokusai Junior Kickboxing||Japan || Decision ||  || 2:00
|-  style="background:#CCFFCC;"
| 2012-03|| Win||align=left| Hamachi|| ||Japan || Decision||||
|-  style="background:#CCFFCC;"
| 2012-03-18|| Win||align=left| Kenta Yoshinaga||Muay Thai WINDY Super Fight vol.9	 ||Japan || Decision||5||1:30 
|-
! style=background:white colspan=9 |
|-  style="background:#CCFFCC;"
| 2011-12-18|| Win||align=left| Tora Wor.Wanchai|| Muay Thai WINDY Super Fight vol.10 2011 FINAL||Japan || Decision || 5|| 1:30
|-  style="background:#CCFFCC;"
| 2011-09-23|| Win||align=left| Kaito Gibu|| Muay Thai Windy Super Fight 8||Japan || KO || 4||
|-  style="background:#cfc;"
| 2011-07-31|| Win ||align=left| Yoshiki Takei|| Muay Thai WINDY Super Fight vol.8||Japan || Ext.R Decision (Unanimous) || 3|| 1:00
|-
! style=background:white colspan=9 |
|-  style="background:#cfc;"
| 2011-07-03|| Win||align=left| Tatsuya Sakakibara || Muay Thai WINDY Super Fight in NAGOYA ～Muay Tyhoon!～||Nagoya, Japan || Decision || 2||2:00
|-  style="background:#CCFFCC;"
| 2011-06-19|| Win||align=left| Hiroto Ishizuka || Muay Thai Windy Super Fight||Nagoya, Japan || KO || 1||
|-  style="background:#CCFFCC;"
| 2011-06-05|| Win||align=left| Yuya Iwanami || Muay Yoko 15, Final ||Tokyo, Japan || Decision (Unanimous) || ||
|-  style="background:#CCFFCC;"
| 2011-06-05|| Win||align=left| Ikki Shimizu || Muay Yoko 15, Semi Final ||Tokyo, Japan || Decision (Unanimous) || ||
|-  style="background:#fbb;"
| 2011-04-29||Loss||align=left| Yoshiki Takei || Muay Thai WINDY Super Fight vol.6, Semi Final||Japan || Ext.R Decision ||  ||
|- style="background:#fbb;"
| 2011-04-02|| Loss || align="left" | Tenshin Nasukawa || Muay Lok 2011 2nd || Tokyo, Japan || Decision || 2 || 2:00
|- style="background:#c5d2ea;"
| 2011-02-20|| Draw|| align="left" | Yuichi Suenaga || Muay Lok 2011 ～1st～　　|| Tokyo, Japan || Decision || 2 || 2:00
|-  style="background:#cfc;"
| 2011-02-13||Win||align=left| Kaisei Iwamoto || Muay Thai WINDY Super Fight||Kyushu, Japan || KO ||  2||
|-  style="background:#cfc;"
| 2010-12-05||Win||align=left| Yuzuki Sakai || MuayThaiOpen 14||Tokyo, Japan || Decision || 2||2:00
|-  style="background:#cfc;"
| 2010-11-07||Win||align=left| Saya Ito || Muay Thai WINDY Super Fight vol.5||Tokyo, Japan || Decision || 2||2:00 
|-
! style=background:white colspan=9 |
|-  style="background:#cfc;"
| 2010-10-|| Win||align=left| Yoshiki Takei || Final ||Japan || Decision || 2 || 1:30
|-  style="background:#cfc;"
| 2010-10-|| Win||align=left| Tatsuya Sakakibara ||Semi Final ||Japan || Ext.R Decision || 3 || 1:00
|-  style="background:#cfc;"
| 2010-10-|| Win||align=left| Kazuya Kurokawa ||Quarter Final ||Japan || Decision || 2 || 1:30
|-  style="background:#cfc;"
| 2010-10-|| Win||align=left| Yuzuki Sakai ||First Round  ||Japan || Decision || 2 || 1:30
|-  style="background:#cfc;"
| 2010-09-19||Win||align=left| Yoshiki Takei || Muay Thai WINDY Super Fight 4 ||Tokyo, Japan || Decision || 2||2:00 
|-
! style=background:white colspan=9 |
|-  style="background:#cfc;"
| 2010-09-19||Win||align=left| Tatsuya Sakakibara || Muay Thai WINDY Super Fight 4 ||Tokyo, Japan || Decision || 2||2:00
|-  style="background:#cfc;"
| 2010-07-11||Win||align=left| Kota Nakano || MuayThaiOpen 12||Tokyo, Japan || Decision || 2||2:00
|-  style="background:#cfc;"
| 2010-06-27||Win||align=left| Hiroki Nishimura || BRIDGE 4th||Japan || Decision || 2||2:00
|-  style="background:#fbb;"
| 2010-06-13|| Loss||align=left| Tatsuya Sakakibara ||Muay Thai WINDY Super Fight 3||Japan || Decision ||  ||
|-  style="background:#cfc;"
| 2010-06-06||Win||align=left| Maki Ishii|| J-1 Grand Prix||Japan || Decision || 2||2:00
|-  style="background:#cfc;"
| 2010-04-25||Win||align=left| Misaki Yamamoto || Muay Yoko 12||Japan || Decision || 2||1:30
|- style="background:#cfc;"
| 2010-01-17|| Win || align="left" | Hiroto Ishizuka|| Muay Lok Junior 1 || Tokyo, Japan || Decision ||  || 
|-
| colspan=9 | Legend:

References

1998 births
Living people
Japanese Muay Thai practitioners